Heroes to Zeros is the third and final studio album by The Beta Band, released in 2004.  It was produced by The Beta Band and mixed by Nigel Godrich.

The cover illustration was created by comic book writer and artist Kaare Andrews. The Beta Band logo for the album was created by comic book artist Dave McCaig, later to be reused on The Best of the Beta Band.

The song "Liquid Bird" features a sample of "Painted Bird" by Siouxsie and the Banshees.

Reception

The album was included in the book 1001 Albums You Must Hear Before You Die.

Track listing
All tracks written by Steve Mason, John Maclean, Richard Greentree, and Robin Jones.
 "Assessment" – 4:34
 "Space" – 4:00
 "Lion Thief" – 3:27
 "Easy" – 2:32
 "Wonderful" – 4:39
 "Troubles" – 2:34
 "Out-Side" – 4:06
 "Space Beatle" – 3:40
 "Rhododendron" – 1:36
 "Liquid Bird" – 3:23
 "Simple" – 3:47
 "Pure For" – 3:55

Additional musicians
"Assessment" brass section
Pete Fry – trombone
Neil Martin – trumpet
Pete Gainey – saxophone
"Simple" and "Troubles" strings section
Dominic Pecher – cello
Alex Lyon – viola
Ben Lee – violin
Ruston Pomeroy – violin

Singles

"Assessment"

United Kingdom
released 12 April 2004
CD 1 REG102CD: "Assessment" / "Shrek"
CD 2 REG102CDS: "Assessment" / "Shrek" / "Assessment" (C Swing's bootleg mix) / "Assessment" (video)
12" CHEMST21: "Assessment" / "Shrek" / "Assessment" (C Swing's bootleg mix)

United States
released 18 May 2004
CD ASW 49063: "Assessment" / "Shrek" / "Assessment" (C Swing's bootleg mix) / "Assessment" (video)
12" ASW 48755: "Assessment" / "Shrek" / "Assessment" (C Swing's bootleg mix)

"Out-Side"

United Kingdom
released 12 July 2004
CD 1 REG110CD: "Out-Side" (radio edit) / "Out-Side" (Roman Nose remix)
CD 2 REG110CDS: "Out-Side" (radio edit) / "Out-Side" (Roman Nose remix) / "Out-Side" (Depth Charge remix) / "Out-Side" (video)
12" REG110: "Out-Side" (radio edit) / "Out-Side" (Roman Nose remix)

References

The Beta Band albums
2004 albums
Astralwerks albums
Virgin Records albums